Mallekan is a village in Ellenabad (sub-division) of Sirsa district, Haryana. Although the village is located in the inferior part of Haryana ( from Chandigarh and Delhi.

Geography and civil affairs 
Mallekan is located between Umedpura at the east, Mehna Khera at the west, Kuttabadh at the north and Madhosinghana at the south.Natha Singh Sarpanch has been a very old sarpanch of village Mallekan From 1970 to 1980, he completed his term and had good relations with Purna Devi Lal, who had been the Deputy Prime Minister, who had been the Chief Minister and Giani Zail Singh, who was his friend  till the Central Government. Till then the work of Mallekan village were doing with Cm under . Together they have done very proper work of the village and till date their name under meeting big work is the Sarpanch of Mallekan village. is taken in he is very breave man proper form

Education

Higher education institutions 
Some nearby higher education School and institutions:
 Govt. High School, Mallekan
 Shawan Singh Institute Of Management 
 Gurukul Pohraka 
 Chaudhary Devi Lal Memorial University
 Shah Satnam Singh College of Pharmacy       
 Jan Nayak Choudry Devi Lal College Of Engineering      
 National College
Gramin Pragati Senior Secondary School, Madhosinghana
 D.A.V School on Phephana road

Demographics
Punjabi is the most extensively spoken language in Mallekan. Some people also use Bagri language to communicate.

Nearby villages
Nearby villages include Umedpura (3.3 km), Mehna Khera (4.9 km), Kuttabadh (6.9 km), Ottu (7.6 km), Modia Khera (7.8 km), Madhosinghana (5 km).

References

External links
Sirsa news
http://www.4jat.com/article.asp?p=Dairy_raided;_samples_taken&k=Mallekan_village
"Ajay speaks up for ‘unregistered’ doctors ". The Tribune, 9 December 2009.
http://tenders.gov.in/innerpage.asp?choice=tc5&tid=har642959&work=1
"Waste management projects to be set up in 25 Sirsa villages". Sushil Manav, Tribune News Service, Sirsa, 13 June 2013.
"Speaker accuses BJP of doublespeak ". Tribune News Service, Sirsa, 22 December 2013.

Villages in Sirsa district